Just! is a series of short story collections by Australian children's author Andy Griffiths, illustrated by Terry Denton. The book series is based on Andy Griffiths's early life. The series has been described as a portrayal of the antics of a pre-teen who "thinks outside the box", and is a "notorious mischiefmaker" who plans various pranks and schemes to dodge doing a chore or going to school, among other things. There have been nine books in the series, with the first book, Just Tricking!, being released in Australia in 1997. It was later released in North America under the alternative title Just Kidding. The Canadian animated series What's with Andy?, which ran on Teletoon from 2001 to 2007, was also loosely based on this book series.

Background 
The author, Andy Griffiths, began writing when he was in the fifth grade. He purchased a typewriter at a second-hand stall at school and created his own magazine, which he sold at school for less than five cents. He then continued writing at high school, but for the school magazine. At university he studied English and American literature and wrote songs for his own rock band, and then went on to study to become a teacher. During his life as a teacher, he began publishing humorous books as the precursor to the “Just!” series. 

Griffiths and his illustrator, Terry Denton, spend their collaborative working time in a studio behind Griffiths’ house, which is decorated with gadgets, toys, a children’s book library, a swimming pool, and bowling alley, much like an imagination of a children’s bedroom. They “push each other to new levels” and “drive each other to ever greater levels of silliness and creativity”. Both Griffiths and Denton believe that through their work, books are equally as entertaining for modern children as electronic medium and offer a ‘personalised imaginative experience’ that will vary between children, allowing for individualised creativity.

Denton studied architecture for a short while before leaving University to experiment in the fields of animation, theatre, painting, and cartooning. Denton’s work has been described as “playful, noisy, humorous, colourful, dramatic, and challenging the reader’s lateral thinking”. He has won various awards for his work as both a writer and illustrator during his career, dating back to 1983, when he realised he had an “urge to write”.

Six children's choice awards were presented to Griffiths in 2008 for the book Just Shocking!, making him the first Australian author to be awarded so.

Style 
Griffiths describes kids’ literature as “either lame or really old-fashioned”, as children, especially in countries outside North America, were being exposed to North American entertainment such as The Simpsons and were increasingly using electronic media. Griffiths also believes his books should reflect his interests in rock and roll, comedy, and pop culture, and in this way, they would be engaging for a modern audience.

Griffiths’ books are also described as being “transitional material for children between 7 and 10 years old”, particularly due to his use of “child-safe humour” through the recurrence of fart jokes and silly puns, and fewer illustrations than many children’s books.

Shaun Tan from The Iowa Review writes that most people believe that the books that most influence them and have made the most impact on the imagination are children’s books or books read during childhood, and that “artists, publishers, booksellers and educators [should] roll up [their] sleeves and get down to the business of making good books".

Mark Macleod notes that much of the stories in Just Tricking deal with the day-to-day lives of the target audience, school-aged children, such as avoiding going to school, and the subsequent battle between parent and child and ultimately, who wins in such a scenario.

Reception 
Andrew McMichael from Western Kentucky University writes:“The idea is to appeal to their sense of the absurd and crazy, and to push (but not cross) the boundaries of what their parents might consider socially acceptable. The books seem to take the socially accepted norms that kids are forced into in their early years and twist them.”Mark Macleod writes in The interdisciplinary Press that Just Tricking, the first book in the series, is “fiction for a generation whose favourite response to any lack of resolution is the shrug, ‘whatever’”. Macleod also describes the first-person-tense of the book as ‘problematic’, as it confuses the stories as autobiographical, thus it is unclear if the stories are the ‘adult author’s past recollected’ or joking ideal of the adult author who dodges their way through life ‘as if he were an oversized kid’. Thus Macleod describes the character in the books, Andy, as ‘living in the elusive space between the creator and the text’.

Details of the series
 Just Tricking! 
Alternate Titles: Just Joking! and Just Kidding!

Released: 1997

This book begins by asking to take the "Tricking Test" to find out if the book is suitable, scoring one point for each 'yes' answer to questions such as playing dead to avoid going to school, pretending to be someone else on the phone, leaving banana skins on footpaths, whether or not you own rubber vomit or fake dog poo, and if you wish it were April Fool's Day every day. Humorously, whether you scored 0 or 5, it says you will love this book.

 Just Annoying! 
Released: 1998

A Publishers Weekly review stated that "Denton's scribbled pen illustrations fill up the margins on every page, with jokes, bizarre flip book animations and other absurdities".

 Just Stupid! 
Released: 1999

Just Stupid! is the third book in the Just! series by Andy Griffiths. It contains various silly short stories, about things such as snail-shell repairing, baby pram riding, and nonsensical dreams. The book received a BILBY Award in the Younger Readers category in 2000.

 Just Crazy! 
Alternative Title: Just Wacky!

Released: 2000

Similarly to the first title in the series, Just Tricking!, the book asks readers to take the "Crazy Test", asking questions like "do you look in the mirror and see a crazy maniac staring back at you?" and "do you sometimes get the urge to take your clothes off and cover yourself in mud?"

 Just Three for Free! 
Released: 2000

This book contains three stories: Playing Dead, In The Shower With Andy, and Runaway Pram.

 Just Disgusting! 
Released: 2002

The test for this book asks if readers pick their nose, wear the same undies two days in a row and wee in swimming pools, among other disgusting things.

 Just Shocking! 
Released: 2007

Following a short break in releases in the series, this book asks if "you wish you could drive around in a monster truck crushing everybody and everything that gets in your way" and if watching videos of people getting involved in accidents is funny.

 Just Macbeth! 
Released: 2009

A different concept from Griffiths and Denton, this book is an alternative version of Macbeth by William Shakespeare. It was also produced by Bell Shakespeare for the stage in various performances nationally, after Griffiths was commissioned by Bell Shakespeare in 2005 to adapt Macbeth for a younger audience.

It is structured as "part narrative, part theatre script" with stage directions and scripted lines, and acts and scenes are replaced by book chapters.

 Just Doomed! 
Released: 2012

The "Doomed Test" asks if you have ever broken a mirror, walked under a ladder or opened an umbrella inside, among other superstitious things.

References

Book series introduced in 1997
Children's short story collections
Short story collections by Andy Griffiths
Series of children's books
Novels set in the 1970s
Australian non-fiction books
Pan Books books